Karp "Karapet" Mkrtchi Khachvankyan (January 23, 1923, Akhaltskha – November 29, 1998, Yerevan) was an Armenian actor and director, People's Artist of Armenia (1967). He was known as the "King of Laughter".

Biography
From 1941 to 1944. Khachvankyan studied at the Actor's school of the Tbilisi film studio. From 1944 until his death, Khachvankyan acted at the Paronyan Musical Comedy Theatre of Yerevan, performing more than 100 roles.

From 1984 to 1988, Khachvankyan was the artistic director of the Paronyan and directed 13 plays.

He was best known for his comic roles, such as Knyaz in Taxi, Taxi, Thodoros in the Dimitris Psathas play Liar Wanted, and Skapen in Skapen’s Pranks.

His directing included Man of La Mancha (where he played both Miguel de Cervantes and Don Quixote), Silva by Emmerich Kálmán, and Love under the Stars by A. Ayvazyan.

Khachvankyan also played in films, including The Girl from Ararat Valley (1950), Patvi hamar (1956), and Road to the Stage (1963).

Selected filmography

Acting 

 1949 - The Girl of Ararat Valley, as Poghos
 1956 - Patvi hamar, as Suren Elizbarov 
 1963 - Road to the Stage, as Ashot
 1982 - Eastern Dentist, as Niko (TV Movie)
 Taxi, Taxi, as Knyaz 
 Liar Wanted, as  Thodoros
 Skapen’s Pranks as Skapen

Directing 

 Man of La Mancha
 Silva 
 Love under the Stars

References

External links
 
 Biography
 Karp Khachvankyan

1923 births
1998 deaths
20th-century Armenian male actors
Male actors from Yerevan
Armenian male film actors
Armenian male stage actors